Joseph Wayne Wallace (July 29, 1989 – April 19, 1993) was a three-year-old boy who was murdered by his mother in their Chicago, Illinois apartment in 1993. Wallace's mother, Amanda Wallace (July 24, 1965 – August 3, 1997), was known to be mentally ill. Despite this, Joseph and his younger brother Joshua were removed from a foster family and returned to Amanda, who killed Joseph with an electrical cord. The circumstances of Wallace's death and the ensuing public outcry precipitated large changes in the Illinois child welfare system and the Cook County juvenile court.

In June 1996, Amanda Wallace was convicted of her son's murder. She avoided the death penalty which had been sought by the state of Illinois and was instead sentenced to life imprisonment. Amanda committed suicide by hanging in her prison cell on August 3, 1997.

Joshua, the only surviving son of Wallace, spent years stuck in the child welfare system. Shortly after Joseph's death Joshua began to display significant emotional and behavioral outbursts, either from witnessing his brother's murder or the continued disruption in his placements. From 1993 to 1995, Joshua lived in the care of Erma and Phillip Lee in Oak Park, Illinois. By May 1995, Joshua was again removed from his only long-term home placement over claims the Lees sought to exploit Joshua for larger state payments. Joshua was adopted by Illinois resident Maria Travis in August 1997. Following his adoption, Joshua's name was legally changed to Joshua Travis. Since 2015, Joshua resides in Park Forest, Illinois.

See also

 Social programs in the United States

References

1989 births
1993 deaths
1993 in Illinois
1993 murders in the United States
April 1993 events in the United States
April 1993 crimes
Child abuse resulting in death
Deaths by person in Illinois
History of Chicago
Incidents of violence against boys
Filicides in the United States
Male murder victims
Murdered American children
People from Chicago
People murdered in Illinois
Place of birth missing